Samuel Nicholas Hipa (born November 30, 1982) is an American heavy metal guitarist. He has performed with several notable acts. He is the current lead guitarist of Mire, and was the longtime former lead guitarist of As I Lay Dying.

Background 

Hipa started his musical career with the band Evelynn. The band was signed to Pluto Records. In 2001, Evelynn toured with As I Lay Dying. As Evelynn started to disperse, Hipa joined As I Lay Dying in 2003.

As I Lay Dying ran its course with the same lineup since 2007, up until Tim Lambesis' arrest, when Hipa, Phil Sgrosso, and Josh Gilbert departed from the band. Alongside AILD drummer Jordan Mancino and Oh, Sleeper and Hipa's former band-mate, Shane Blay, the group of friends formed Wovenwar.

In a more recent interview, Mancino stated that AILD is still technically five members, himself, Lambesis, Hipa, Gilbert, and Sgrosso. Hipa performed lead guitars for Wovenwar, appearing on both Wovenwar (2014) and Honor Is Dead (2016) to date. In 2017, Lambesis reformed As I Lay Dying, with all new members, stating that none of the previous members, Hipa included, would return. Nevertheless, on June 8, 2018, it was confirmed that Hipa along with the "classic" lineup of As I Lay Dying reunited with Lambesis with the release of "My Own Grave". On April 12, 2019, the band released a second single, titled "Redefined", which also features August Burns Red frontman Jake Luhrs.

Hipa was featured on Billy on the Street.

On August 15, 2020, it was reported that Nick Hipa had left As I Lay Dying. In July 2022, it was announced that Hipa would be performing with the band God Forbid for their reunion show.

As I Lay Dying controversy 

Lambesis, after his arrest, said negative things about the rest of the band, Hipa included. Hipa responded to these statements–particularly accusations of the entire band secretly being atheists and lack of contact with Lambesis after the arrest–calling them slanderous.

In November 2016, Hipa stated that Lambesis was, at the time, still of the same mind and that the relationship between the two remained damaged. Hipa's tone however, changed in an October 2017 interview with Hatebreed frontman Jamey Jasta when asked about a potential As I Lay Dying reunion with the classic members–Hipa replied: "Man, I'm on the spot… people ask us about it a lot. But what it comes down to is what makes sense with what we have going on in our lives. And we've got a lot of important things going on that don't relate to that and we've made commitments to, and that's what we are honoring at this moment. Honestly it's just not something we try and consume our thoughts with. Because it's like we have families, businesses, professions, and a band—and all these things we’re super invested into. It's like all of our attention is there with that at the moment."

In 2018, Hipa reunited with As I Lay Dying, but rumors surfaced in 2020 that he had left the band once again. Hipa broke his year-long silence in 2021, stating that "Respectfully, I left because the story and meaning we built our reunion upon decayed considerably over time. What primarily endures is a superficial pursuit I cannot justify supporting or being part of." He further elaborated that making music with the band came "at the cost of tolerating behavior which at times mistreats, disrespects, and hurts other people."

Christianity 
Hipa was raised with Christian values. Over time, Hipa started to exhibit some skepticism, though only on a lower scale, never disclaiming the belief system as a whole.

Bands 

Current
 Wovenwar (2013–present)
 Mire (2021–present)
 God Forbid (2022–present)
Former
 Evelynn (2001–2004)
 As I Lay Dying (2003–2014, 2018–2020)

Discography 
As I Lay Dying
Shadows Are Security (2005)
A Long March: The First Recordings (compilation, 2006)
An Ocean Between Us (2007)
The Powerless Rise (2010)
Decas (compilation, 2011)
Awakened (2012)
 Shaped by Fire (2019)

Wovenwar
 Wovenwar (2014)
 Honor Is Dead (2016)

Guest performances
 Total Brutal (2008) – Austrian Death Machine
 Ghost Thief (2013) – Living Sacrifice
 Skydancer (2015) – In Hearts Wake
 Wanderer (2016) – Heaven Shall Burn

Production
 Void (2016) – Destroy the Runner (Teaser production)

References

External links

American heavy metal guitarists
Metal Blade Records artists
Christian metal musicians
Living people
American performers of Christian music
As I Lay Dying (band) members
Wovenwar members
1982 births
21st-century American guitarists
African-American guitarists
21st-century African-American musicians
20th-century African-American people